Miera is a municipality located in the autonomous community of Cantabria, Spain. It has a population of 420 inhabitants (2013).

Localities 
 Ajanedo.
 La Cantolla.
 La Cárcoba (Capital).
 Irías.
 Linto.
 Mirones.
 Mortesante.
 Los Pumares.
 Solana.
 La Toba.
 La Vega.

References

Municipalities in Cantabria